This is a list of albums released under the Jellyfish Entertainment record label from 2007 and after.

 PROJECT ALBUM Color key

Year

2007

2008

2009

2010

2011

2012

2013

2014

2015

2016

2017

2018

2019

2020

2021

2022

Charted singles

References

External links
Jellyfish Entertainment Official Site
Jellyfish Entertainment on YouTube

Jellyfish Entertainment
Pop music discographies
Discographies of South Korean record labels